Parsley is a surname, and may refer to:

Ambrosia Parsley (b. 1971), American singer-songwriter
Cliff Parsley (born 1954), American football punter
Eliza Hall Nutt Parsley (1842–1920), American philanthropist and schoolteacher
Henry N. Parsley, Jr. (born 1948), American bishop
Ian Parsley (b. 1977), Northern Ireland politician and businessman
Jamie Parsley (born 1969), American poet and Episcopalian priest
Lea Ann Parsley (born 1968), American skeleton racer
Neil Parsley (born 1966), English footballer
Osbert Parsley (1511-1585), English renaissance composer
Rod Parsley (born 1957), American televangelist
Ross Parsley, American pastor